Sergei Makarov or Sergey Makarov may refer to:

Sergei Makarov (ice hockey, born 1958), Russian ice hockey right winger and two-time Olympic gold medalist 
Sergei Makarov (ice hockey, born 1964), Russian ice hockey defenceman
Sergey Makarov (javelin thrower) (born 1973), Russian javelin thrower
Sergey Makarov (volleyball), Russian volleyball player
Sergei Makarov (footballer) (born 1996), Russian football midfielder